LNZ may refer to:

LNZ, the IATA code for Linz Airport, a minor international airport in Hörsching, Austria
LNZ, the National Rail code for Lenzie railway station, East Dunbartonshire, Scotland